Demisa is a Papuan language of the Indonesian province of Papua, on the eastern shore of Cenderawasih Bay. It is spoken in Botawa, Desawa, and Muyere villages.

References

Languages of western New Guinea
East Geelvink Bay languages